The Insatiable is a direct-to-DVD American vampire film released in 2006. The plot follows solitary cubical worker Harry Balbo (Sean Patrick Flanery) as he attempts to capture the vampire Tatiana (Charlotte Ayanna) with the assistance of vampire hunter Strickland (Michael Biehn).

Plot 
Harry Balbo (Sean Patrick Flanery) is a downtrodden office worker struggling with his job and introverted social life. One evening, he witnesses a  gruesome attack by a vampiress, becoming determined to slay her. In his research, he finds that vampires are descended from the succubus. In the basement of his apartment condominium, he manufactures a cell and manages to capture the vampiress, named Tatiana (Charlotte Ayanna). Instead of annihilating her, he allows her to live; slowly connecting with her, never knowing for sure if she really cares about him. Eventually, he considers if he should permit her feeding upon him.

To keep her healthy and "alive," he feeds her rabbits which he purchases from pet stores, though she still stresses the importance of living human blood. Harry's emotional dependency towards Tatiana grows daily and she seems to warm up to him as well. He tries to feed her human blood which he purchased online, but she angrily rejects it. Eventually, he encounters Strickland (Michael Biehn), a wheelchair-using army veteran whose battalion was slain by vampires and has spent the years since as a recluse tracking vampires worldwide and working out of his apartment and on the Internet through surveillance.

The film ends with a despondent Harry, on the brink of insanity, willingly offering himself to Tatiana. Having grown attached to him, she is reluctant, though her bloodlust eventually takes over and she feeds. She turns Harry into a vampire and they begin to feed together.

Cast 
 Sean Patrick Flanery as Harry Balbo
 Charlotte Ayanna as Tatiana 
 Michael Biehn as Strickland
 Amanda Noret as Cindi

References

External links 
 

2006 films
2006 science fiction films
2007 directorial debut films
2000s English-language films